

A

Ajak 

Ajak (portrayed by Salma Hayek) is the wise and spiritual leader of the Eternals, who possesses healing abilities and functions as the "bridge" between the Eternals and the Celestial Arishem. Based on this dynamic, Ajak is aware that the Emergence will occur, and she decides to try and stop it in the present day based on her growing love for humanity. However, fellow Eternal Ikaris sees this as betrayal and leads her to be killed by the Deviants, with Sersi becoming the new bridge to Arishem.

Hayek was originally hesitant when she was offered the role, assuming she would only have a role as a supporting character of "grandmother." Ajak's comic-book counterpart is male, and Hayek stated that making the change to female allowed her to lean into the character's femininity as a "mother figure" to the rest of the Eternals.

, the character has appeared in the film Eternals.

Algrim / Kurse 

Algrim (portrayed by Adewale Akinnuoye-Agbaje), also known as Kurse, is a Dark Elf, and Malekith's lieutenant. He is one of the few Dark Elves who survived the catastrophe that almost wiped out their race. He is physically stronger and more durable than Thor, due to having his abilities enhanced with the Kurse Stone, enabling him to survive blows from Mjolnir, although Loki kills him with a black hole grenade.

, the character has appeared in the film Thor: The Dark World and the television series Loki (archival footage).

Ammit 

Ammit (motion-captured by Sofia Danu, voiced by Saba Mubarak) is the imprisoned Egyptian goddess that resembles a humanoid version of her classical depiction whom Arthur Harrow plans to release. Ammit is known as "The Devourer of the Dead" and plans to cast her preemptive judgement on all of humanity. She is successfully released by Harrow and grants him as her avatar. They begin her plan, but are stopped by combined efforts of Marc, Steven, Layla, and Khonshu. Ammit is then trapped inside Harrow’s body in order to permanently kill them both. Marc refuses and is released from his servitude, but Khonshu has Jake Lockley carry out the assassination. She is based on the Egyptian goddess of the same name.

, the character has appeared in the Disney+ series Moon Knight.

Ancient One 

The Ancient One (portrayed by Tilda Swinton) is the former Sorcerer Supreme and mentor of Stephen Strange who is killed by Kaecilius. In 2023, Bruce Banner time-travels to 2012 where he meets the Ancient One at the Sanctum Sanctorum while looking for the Time Stone.

In the comics, the character is a Tibetan man, while the film version is an androgynous Celtic portrayed by Tilda Swinton. Swinton's casting was widely criticized as whitewashing. Director Scott Derrickson and co-writer C. Robert Cargill wanted to avoid adapting the character as portrayed in the comics, as they felt it was perpetuating Asian Fu Manchu stereotypes from the time period, while also aggravating the Tibetan sovereignty debate. Derrickson initially wanted to change the character to an Asian woman, but he felt that this would either invoke the Dragon Lady stereotype or Asian fetishism, depending on the age of the actress. He also wanted to avoid the stereotype of a "Western character coming to Asia to learn about being Asian," so he ultimately decided to cast a non-Asian actor in the role. Swinton was cast because Derrickson felt that she could play the "domineering, secretive, ethereal, enigmatic, [and] mystical" side of the character. Swinton also chose to portray the character as androgynous, though the film uses the pronouns "she" and "her." Derrickson said he was pleased with the diversity of the film's cast, in terms of both gender and ethnicity, but acknowledged that "Asians have been whitewashed and stereotyped in American cinema for over a century and people should be mad or nothing will change. What I did was the lesser of two evils, but it is still an evil." Looking back at the casting in May 2021, Feige said the studio thought they were being "so smart and so cutting-edge" when they avoided the wise old Asian man stereotype, but the criticism of the casting was a wake-up call that made them realize they could have cast an Asian actor in the role without falling into stereotypes.

, the character has appeared in the film Doctor Strange. An alternate version of the Ancient One appeared in the film Avengers: Endgame, while another alternate version of the Ancient One appeared in the Disney+ animated series What If...?

Aneka 

Aneka (portrayed by Michaela Coel) is a Wakandan warrior and member of the Dora Milaje. Aneka later takes upon the mantle of the Midnight Angels, along with Okoye. Aneka is additionally romantically involved with Ayo.

, the character has appeared in the film Black Panther: Wakanda Forever.

Arishem 

Arishem (voiced by David Kaye) is a Celestial who created the Deviants, and later the Eternals once the Deviants rebelled against their programming. Awesome in scale, Arishem communicates with only one member of a given group of ten Eternals: on Earth, this is Ajak, and later Sersi after Ajak's death. After the Emergence is stopped, Arishem takes Sersi, Phastos, and Kingo away for judgement, vowing to spare Earth only if their memories show that humanity is worth sparing.

, the character has appeared in the film Eternals.

Attuma 

Attuma (portrayed by Alex Livinalli) is a warrior from Talokan.

, the character has appeared in the film Black Panther: Wakanda Forever.

Ayesha 

Ayesha (portrayed by Elizabeth Debicki) is the high priestess of the golden-skinned Sovereign race. She hires the Guardians of the Galaxy to protect Anulax Batteries from the Abilisk, but after Rocket steals several of the batteries with the intention to later sell them, she becomes enraged and sends her fleet of Omnicraft to kill them. Later, she is seen observing the gestation of a new member of the Sovereign race, and names it Adam.

, the character has appeared in the film Guardians of the Galaxy Vol. 2. An alternate version of Ayesha appeared in the Disney+ animated series What If...? She will return in the upcoming film Guardians of the Galaxy Vol. 3.

Ayo 

Ayo (portrayed by Florence Kasumba) is the second-in-command of the Dora Milaje in Wakanda. She is promoted to being the general of the Dora Milaje after Okoye is removed. She is also shown to be in a romantic relationship with Aneka.

, the character has appeared in four films: Captain America: Civil War (cameo), Black Panther, Avengers: Infinity War, Black Panther: Wakanda Forever; as well as the Disney+ TV series of The Falcon and the Winter Soldier.

B

Hunter B-15 

Hunter B-15 (portrayed by Wunmi Mosaku) is an agent of the Time Variance Authority and a brainwashed "time variant" who later remembers her family.

, the character has appeared in the Disney+ series Loki.

Nakia Bahadir 

Nakia Bahadir (portrayed by Yasmeen Fletcher) is Kamala Khan's close friend.

, the character has appeared in the Disney+ series Ms. Marvel.

Bruce Banner / Hulk

Bucky Barnes / Winter Soldier / White Wolf

Clint Barton / Hawkeye / Ronin

Laura Barton 

Laura Barton (portrayed by Linda Cardellini) is a former S.H.I.E.L.D. agent, the wife of Clint Barton, and the mother of Cooper, Lila, and Nathaniel Barton. To protect themselves, Laura and her children live in secrecy, unbeknownst to the Avengers. However, the Avengers visit the Barton farm in 2015, and Laura mentions that she is pregnant with their third child. Clint decides to retire from the Avengers to be with his family, and Laura later gives birth to Nathaniel. In 2018, she and all three Barton children become victims of the Blip, but are brought back to life in 2023.

, the character has appeared in two films: Avengers: Age of Ultron and Avengers: Endgame; as well as in the Disney+ series Hawkeye.

Georges Batroc 

Georges Batroc (portrayed by Georges St-Pierre) is an Algerian mercenary and pirate at the top of Interpol's Red Notice, as well as a former DGSE agent who scored 36 kill missions before being demobilized by the French government.

, the character has appeared in the film Captain America: The Winter Soldier and the Disney+ series The Falcon and the Winter Soldier. An alternate version of Batroc appeared in the Disney+ animated series What If...?

Quentin Beck / Mysterio 

Quentin Beck (portrayed by Jake Gyllenhaal), is a former Stark Industries employee and holographic illusions specialist who masquerades as a superhero named Mysterio, who claims to be from Earth-833. He is recruited by Nick Fury to help Spider-Man stop the Elementals, which he secretly creates through illusions as a way to get recognition for his life's work, and revenge due to his grievance at Stark Industries and by the late Tony Stark, his former employer. He is killed after one of the drones backfires, with William Ginter Riva downloading the drones' data and doctoring the footage to frame Spider-Man for the attack in addition to Beck revealing Parker's identity to the world.

, the character has appeared in two films: Spider-Man: Far From Home and Spider-Man: No Way Home (archival footage), as well as the web series The Daily Bugle (archival footage).

Yelena Belova 

Yelena Belova (portrayed by Florence Pugh) is a highly trained spy and assassin who trained in the Red Room as a Black Widow and is an adopted sister to Natasha Romanoff. In 2016, she works with Romanoff, Alexei Shostakov, and Melina Vostokoff to stop General Dreykov after he reactivates the Red Room program. Following the Blip, which she fell victim to, and Romanoff's death, Belova is approached by Contessa Valentina Allegra de Fontaine to kill Clint Barton for his involvement in her sister Natasha's death. She locates Barton along with Kate Bishop and Maya Lopez and fights against them as a masked vigilante, until Barton unmasks her and she is forced to retreat. On Christmas Eve, Belova infiltrates the Bishop Christmas family party to kill Barton, but Bishop intercepts and fights her. Belova confronts Barton on the Rockefeller Center ice rink, and at first she does not believe his story about Romanoff's sacrifice. It is not until Barton reveals the details about the relationship between her and Romanoff, details that he could only have been told by Natasha, that she accepts her adopted-sister's death was an act of self-sacrifice, rather than a murder, as she was previously led to believe.

, the character has appeared in the film Black Widow, as well as in the Disney+ series Hawkeye. She will return in the upcoming film Thunderbolts. An alternate version of Belova will appear in the upcoming animated series Marvel Zombies.

Eleanor Bishop 

Eleanor Bishop (portrayed by Vera Farmiga) is the wealthy mother of Kate Bishop. After her husband Derek dies in 2012, she becomes engaged to Jack Duquesne by 2024.

, the character has appeared in the Disney+ series Hawkeye.

Kate Bishop

Emil Blonsky / Abomination 

Emil Blonsky (portrayed by Tim Roth), also known as the Abomination, is a British Royal Marine who is transformed into an atrocious humanoid creature with enhanced physiology and a deformed appearance as a result of being injected with an experimental version of the Super Soldier Serum, in conjunction with subsequent exposure to intense gamma radiation much like Bruce Banner himself years prior.

S.H.I.E.L.D. was initially in charge of keeping Blonsky detained, in a cryo cell in Alaska; Phil Coulson once threatened to send Grant Ward to work there. Following S.H.I.E.L.D.'s collapse, Damage Control took over detaining him and placed Blonsky in a supermax prison in California. Post-Blip, Blonsky had gained control of himself on multiple levels, mellowing out and regaining his human form; after 14 years imprisoned, he was looking for parole.

, the character has appeared in two films: The Incredible Hulk and Shang-Chi and the Legend of the Ten Rings; as well as the Disney+ series She-Hulk: Attorney at Law and the Marvel One-Shot The Consultant (archival footage). An alternate version of the character will appear in the animated series Marvel Zombies.

Elsa Bloodstone 

Elsa Bloodstone (portrayed by Laura Donnelly) is the estranged daughter of Ulysses Bloodstone who dislikes her family's tradition of hunting monsters.

, the character has appeared in the Disney+ special Werewolf by Night.

Verussa Bloodstone 

Verussa Bloodstone (portrayed by Harriet Sansom Harris) is a monster hunter, Ulysses Bloodstone's widow, and Elsa Bloodstone's stepmother. After her husband dies, she becomes the leader of his group of monster hunters.

, the character has appeared in the Disney+ special Werewolf by Night.

Ralph Bohner 

Ralph Bohner (portrayed by Evan Peters) is a Westview resident who Agatha Harkness forces to impersonate Wanda Maximoff's twin brother Pietro. Harkness possesses him, imbuing him with Pietro's super-speed and making him to play the role in order to discover how Wanda created her alternate reality. He is initially introduced as the unseen husband of "Agnes" (Harkness' alias), who was frequently mentioned whenever Agnes needed a punchline for a laugh line. He is freed from Harkness' control when Monica Rambeau removes a magical necklace he was wearing.

, the character has appeared in the Disney+ series WandaVision. The role was a nod to Peters' character in 20th Century Fox's X-Men film series, Peter Maximoff.

Blackagar Boltagon / Black Bolt 

Blackagar Boltagon / Black Bolt (portrayed by Anson Mount) is the Head of the Inhuman Royal Family and King of Attilan, whose voice can cause destruction with the slightest whisper.

In Earth-838, Black Bolt is a member of the Illuminati who is killed by Wanda Maximoff.

, the character has appeared in the Marvel Television series Inhumans. His Earth-838 counterpart appeared in the film Doctor Strange in the Multiverse of Madness.

Mallory Book 

Mallory Book, Esq. (portrayed by Renée Elise Goldsberry) is a lawyer at GLK&H who is threatened by Jennifer Walters becoming the new head of the superhuman law division.

, the character has appeared in the Disney+ series She-Hulk: Attorney at Law.

Isaiah Bradley 

Isaiah Bradley (portrayed by Carl Lumbly) is an elderly super soldier who served in the Korean War, during which time he was sent behind enemy lines to fight the brainwashed Bucky Barnes, whose metal arm he damaged. After rescuing other black super soldiers who were being held prisoner, he was imprisoned by the U.S. government and Hydra for 30 years, experimented on, and his existence kept a secret, with not even Steve Rogers knowing of him. A nurse helped him escape by forging his death and he went into hiding. By 2024, he lives in Baltimore with his grandson Eli (portrayed by Elijah Richardson). He refuses to help Sam Wilson and Barnes when they seek him out, revealing his hatred for the government and contempt for the idea of a Black man becoming Captain America. Later, he is provided with his own memorial and statue in the Smithsonian Institution with Wilson's help.

, the character has appeared in the Disney+ series The Falcon and the Winter Soldier. He will return in the upcoming film Captain America: New World Order.

Betty Brant 

Elizabeth "Betty" Brant (portrayed by Angourie Rice) is a student at Midtown School of Science and Technology. This version of the character, in terms of appearance, bears a similarity to Gwen Stacy from the comic books, having long blonde hair and often wearing a black headband. She is Liz's best friend, and host of the school's news report alongside Jason Ionello, who is implied to have an unrequited crush on her. In 2018, she is a victim of the Blip, but is restored to life in 2023. In 2024, she enters a brief relationship with Ned Leeds in Europe, maintaining a friendship after breaking up.

, the character has appeared in three films: Spider-Man: Homecoming, Spider-Man: Far From Home, and Spider-Man: No Way Home; as well as the second season of the web series The Daily Bugle, as the website's newest unpaid intern.

Jackson Brice / Shocker 

Jackson Brice (portrayed by Logan Marshall-Green) is a member of Adrian Toomes' criminal enterprise who wields a modified version of Brock Rumlow's vibro-blast emitting gauntlet and calls himself the "Shocker". After a weapons deal with Aaron Davis attracts Spider-Man's attention, Toomes fires him for his recklessness, to which Brice threatens to expose their operation. In response, Toomes fires one of Phineas Mason's weapons at Brice to intimidate him, but inadvertently disintegrates him instead. Following this, Toomes gives his vibro-gauntlet and the mantle of "Shocker" to fellow associate Herman Schultz.

, the character has appeared in the film Spider-Man: Homecoming.

Eddie Brock / Venom

Sonny Burch 

Sonny Burch (portrayed by Walton Goggins) is a "low-level criminal-type" who wants Hank Pym's quantum technology to sell on the black market. He has henchmen (consisting of Uzman, Anitolov, Knox, and FBI agent Stoltz) and is the owner of a restaurant (presumably as a front). Sonny attempts to buy Pym's Ant-Man technology, but gets turned down by Hope van Dyne. Sonny's men subsequently battle Van Dyne and Scott Lang. He later manages to get information out of Lang's friends Luis, Kurt, and Dave via his "truth serum" concoction.

, the character has appeared in the film Ant-Man and the Wasp.

C

Carina 

Carina (portrayed by Ophelia Lovibond) is the Collector's slave.

, the character has appeared in two films: Thor: The Dark World (mid-credits cameo) and Guardians of the Galaxy. An alternate version of Carina appeared in the Disney+ animated series What If...?

Bruno Carrelli 

Bruno Carrelli (portrayed by Matt Lintz) is Kamala Khan's best friend.

, the character has appeared in the Disney+ series Ms. Marvel.

Mitchell Carson 

Mitchell Carson (portrayed by Martin Donovan) is the former head of defense at S.H.I.E.L.D. while secretly working for Hydra. When Hank Pym discovers S.H.I.E.L.D. has been trying to replicate his Pym particles in 1989, he confronts Carson, Peggy Carter, and Howard Stark. In 2015, Carson allies himself with Pym's former protege-turned-adversary, Darren Cross, who has managed to successfully replicate the Pym particles. During a confrontation among these parties, Carson absconds with the particles.

, the character has appeared in the film Ant-Man.

Peggy Carter

Sharon Carter / Agent 13 / Power Broker 

Sharon Carter (portrayed by Emily VanCamp), also known as Agent 13, is Peggy Carter's niece. She initially appears as an agent of S.H.I.E.L.D. and later of the CIA, before going into hiding in Madripoor where she secretly works as the Power Broker.

, the character has appeared in two films: Captain America: The Winter Soldier and Captain America: Civil War; as well as the Disney+ series The Falcon and the Winter Soldier. An alternate version of Sharon Carter appeared in the Disney+ animated series What If...?

America Chavez 

America Chavez (portrayed by Xochitl Gomez) is a teenager from the Utopian Parallel who has the ability to travel between dimensions in the multiverse by punching open star-shaped doorways. After traveling across the multiverse along with Stephen Strange and helping to remove the Darkhold influence over Wanda Maximoff, she chooses to stay on Earth-616 and learn the mystic arts at Kamar-Taj under Wong's tutelage.

, the character has appeared in the film Doctor Strange in the Multiverse of Madness.

Helen Cho 

Dr. Helen Cho (portrayed by Claudia Kim) is a world-renowned Korean geneticist and the leader of the U-GIN Research Group. She is called upon to assist the Avengers with her research and technology in the war against Hydra, treating Clint Barton's injuries. Later, she is approached and brainwashed by Ultron to create a new body for him using vibranium and synthetic tissue, this body becoming Vision.

, the character has appeared in the film Avengers: Age of Ultron.

Clea 

Clea (portrayed by Charlize Theron) is a sorceress from the Dark Dimension who comes to Earth to enlist Stephen Strange's help.

, the character has appeared in the film Doctor Strange in the Multiverse of Madness (mid-credits cameo).

P. Cleary 

P. Cleary (portrayed by Arian Moayed) is an agent for the Department of Damage Control (DODC). Cleary helmed interrogations against Peter Parker and his friends and family when Mysterio ousted his secret identity as Spider-Man. Cleary also expressed interest in investigating an incident at AvengerCon in New Jersey.

, the character has appeared in the film Spider-Man: No Way Home and the Disney+ series Ms. Marvel.

Curt Connors / Lizard 

Dr. Curt Connors (voiced by Rhys Ifans), also known as the Lizard, is an Oscorp scientist from an alternate reality who transformed into a large reptilian monster while trying to regrow his missing arm.

Ifans reprises his role from Marc Webb's The Amazing Spider-Man (2012) in Spider-Man: No Way Home; footage of when Connors is cured is taken directly from that film.

Cosmo the Spacedog 

Cosmo the Spacedog (physically portrayed by dog actors Fred and Slate, with voice and additional motion capture by Maria Bakalova) is a member of the Guardians of the Galaxy who is a sapient dog that developed psionic abilities after being sent into space by the Soviet Union.

, the character has appeared in two films: Guardians of the Galaxy and Guardians of the Galaxy Vol. 2, as well as in the Disney+ special The Guardians of the Galaxy Holiday Special. She will return in the upcoming film Guardians of the Galaxy Vol. 3.

Phil Coulson

Darren Cross / Yellowjacket / M.O.D.O.K.

Dr. Darren Cross (portrayed by Corey Stoll) is Hank Pym's former protégé. He attempts to re-create the Pym particle formula and sell at a black market auction, but is foiled by Scott Lang, Pym, and Pym's daughter Hope van Dyne, Darren's own protégé and would-be romantic interest. After donning the Yellowjacket suit, he was unevenly shrunken to subatomic size in the Quantum Realm and became a mutated, cybernetically enhanced individual with an oversized head known as M.O.D.O.K. (an acronym for "Mechanized Organism Designed Only for Killing").

, the character has appeared in two films: Ant-Man and Ant-Man and the Wasp: Quantumania; as well as the WHIH Newsfront viral marketing campaign.

D

Carol Danvers / Captain Marvel

Dave 

Dave (portrayed by Tip "T.I." Harris) is a friend of Scott Lang and Luis who works as Lang's getaway driver during heists. He enjoys playing poker and watching football. He later teases Hank Pym about the heist they pulled in his house before he became one of his employees.

, the character has appeared in two films: Ant-Man and Ant-Man and the Wasp.

Aaron Davis 

Aaron Davis (portrayed by Donald Glover) is a low-level criminal with a sense of morality. He attempts to buy high-tech firearms from Herman Schultz and Jackson Brice, only to be interrupted by Spider-Man. The hero later confronts Davis, webs his hand to his car, and questions him regarding Adrian Toomes' plans. Davis gives information about a sale with his former acquaintance Mac Gargan, and admits to wanting to keep the weapons off the streets to protect his nephew. Spider-Man leaves Davis trapped.

, the character has appeared in the film Spider-Man: Homecoming.

Valentina Allegra de Fontaine 

Contessa Valentina Allegra de Fontaine (portrayed by Julia Louis-Dreyfus), also known by her nickname Val, is an influential contessa who approaches John Walker after he is stripped of the mantle of Captain America following his killing a member of the Flag Smashers. She expresses sympathy for his situation and tells him that the people she works for may have use for his services. She later convinces Walker to take up the mantle of the U.S. Agent. De Fontaine is also Yelena Belova's handler, recruiting her for a mission to kill Clint Barton, being revealed that de Fontaine's client who requested this mission is Eleanor Bishop. De Fontaine becomes the new director of the Central Intelligence Agency (CIA), and it is revealed that she is the ex-wife of CIA officer Everett K. Ross, and that she wants the United States to procure Wakanda's supply of vibranium.

, the character has appeared in two films: Black Widow (post-credits cameo) and Black Panther: Wakanda Forever, as well as in the Disney+ series The Falcon and the Winter Soldier.  She will return in the upcoming film Thunderbolts.

Death Dealer 

The Death Dealer (portrayed by Andy Le) is a Ten Rings assassin and Shang-Chi's martial arts mentor during his youth. He accompanied Razor Fist and the Ten Rings in acquiring Xialing's pendant where he fought Shang-Chi before Wenwu broke up the fight. During the battle of Ta Lo, Death Dealer is the first person killed by the forces of the Dweller-in-Darkness, prompting the Ten Rings into forming a truce with the Ta Lo villagers.

, the character has appeared in the film Shang-Chi and the Legend of the Ten Rings. An alternate version of the character will appear in the upcoming Disney+ animated series Marvel Zombies.

Rhomann Dey 

Rhomann Dey (portrayed by John C. Reilly) is a member of the Nova Corps and contact to Peter Quill and the Guardians of the Galaxy. He is promoted to the rank of Denarian due to his actions during the Battle of Xandar.

, the character has appeared in the film Guardians of the Galaxy.

Max Dillon / Electro 

Max Dillon (portrayed by Jamie Foxx), also known as Electro, is an Oscorp electrical engineer from an alternate reality who gained electric powers after an accident involving genetically modified electric eels.

Foxx reprises his role from Marc Webb's The Amazing Spider-Man 2 (2014) in Spider-Man: No Way Home, where the character is redesigned, foregoing his original blue Ultimate Marvel-based design in favor of a yellow one more similar to his mainstream comic book appearance.

Dormammu 

Dormammu (voiced by Benedict Cumberbatch and an unidentified British actor) is a primordial inter-dimensional entity and ruler of the Dark Dimension. He wields apocalyptic levels of supernatural power. Dormammu seeks to absorb all other universes into his Dark Dimension and turn the victims into Mindless Ones. The Zealots misinterpret this eternal existence as a benevolent longevity, and Dormammu gives them some of his power. Stephen Strange uses the Time Stone to trap himself and Dormammu in an endless loop, where he offers a bargain and dies when the entity refuses. Desperate to escape this loop, Dormammu accepts the bargain to end it in exchange for taking his Zealots from the Earth and never returning to it. This version of Dormammu appears as a massive face made of rippling mystical energy, with his full form never seen.

, the character has appeared in the film Doctor Strange. An alternate version of Dormammu appeared in the Disney+ animated series What If...?

Drax

Dreykov 

General Dreykov (portrayed by Ray Winstone) is a high-ranking officer in the Soviet Armed Forces who acts as the Red Room's overseer and father and superior to Taskmaster. He is killed by Yelena Belova in 2016.

, the character has appeared in the film Black Widow.

Antonia Dreykov / Taskmaster 

Antonia Dreykov (portrayed by Olga Kurylenko), also known as Taskmaster, is an agent of the Red Room, brainwashed by her father, Dreykov. She studies her opponents' fighting style in order to mimic them and learn how to use it against them, and uses techniques from other superheroes.

, the character has appeared in the film Black Widow.  She will return in the upcoming film Thunderbolts.

Druig 

Druig (portrayed by Barry Keoghan) is an aloof Eternal who can use cosmic energy to control the minds of others. He becomes withdrawn from the other Eternals, frustrated because he disagrees with their interactions with humankind. The only exception is Makkari, with whom he develops a trusting, intimate relationship. Druig retreats to the Amazon rainforest and leads a cult, perceiving that he has removed the burden of choice from these humans. However, he reunites with his fellow Eternals when they are attacked by Deviants after coming to his residence.

, the character has appeared in the film Eternals.

Dum Dum Dugan 

Timothy "Dum Dum" Dugan (portrayed by Neal McDonough) is a member and leader of the Howling Commandos who fought alongside Steve Rogers, Bucky Barnes, and Peggy Carter during World War II.

, the character has appeared in the film Captain America: The First Avenger, as well as the Marvel One-Shot Agent Carter and the television series of the same name. An alternate version of Dugan appeared in the Disney+ animated series What If...?

Jack Duquesne 

Jack Duquesne (portrayed by Tony Dalton) is the fiancé of Eleanor Bishop, the nephew of Armand III, and CEO of the shell corporation Sloan Limited. Along with his uncle, he attends a black market auction of items stolen from the Avengers compound in 2024, and steals Ronin's retractable sword. Jack later assists Clint Barton in fighting the Tracksuit Mafia during Kate Bishop's fight with Wilson Fisk.

, the character has appeared in the Disney+ series Hawkeye.

E

Ego 

Ego (portrayed by Kurt Russell) is a Celestial and the father of Peter Quill and Mantis.

, the character has appeared in the film Guardians of the Galaxy Vol. 2. An alternate version of Ego appeared in the Disney+ animated series What If...?

Eitri 

Eitri (portrayed by Peter Dinklage) is the king of the Dwarves, an ancient race of skilled dwarfs. Atypically to his traditional diminutive form in the comic books, the MCU's version of Eitri is depicted at a giant's size (although he still refers to his race as Dwarves). Thor comes to him on Nidavellir asking for a new weapon after Mjolnir was destroyed by Hela. Eitri reveals that Thanos forced the Dwarves to produce the Infinity Gauntlet, before slaughtering the entire race except Eitri, destroying his hands to render him unable to forge anything ever again. Thor, Groot, and Rocket all help Eitri create the new weapon, Stormbreaker.

, the character has appeared in the film Avengers: Infinity War. An alternate version of Eitri appeared in the Disney+ animated series What If...?

Layla El-Faouly  / Scarlet Scarab 

Layla El-Faouly (portrayed by May Calamawy), also known as Scarlet Scarab, is Marc Spector's wife, an archeologist and adventurer who becomes the avatar of Tawaret.

, the character has appeared in the Disney+ series Moon Knight.

Matthew Ellis 

Matthew Ellis (portrayed by William Sadler) is the former President of the United States. In 2012, he is kidnapped on board Air Force One by Eric Savin via the Iron Patriot armor. He becomes a hostage of Aldrich Killian's fake terrorist attack before being rescued by Tony Stark and James Rhodes. In 2014, he is one of the targets marked by Alexander Pierce's Helicarriers before being saved by Steve Rogers and Sam Wilson.

, the character has appeared in the film Iron Man 3, as well as the television series Agents of S.H.I.E.L.D. and the WHIH Newsfront viral marketing campaign.

Eros / Starfox 

Eros (portrayed by Harry Styles), also known as Starfox, is an Eternal and the brother of Thanos.

, the character has appeared in the film Eternals (mid-credits cameo).

Abraham Erskine 

Dr. Abraham Erskine (portrayed by Stanley Tucci) is the creator of the Super Soldier Serum, being responsible for the origin of Steve Rogers as Captain America and Johann Schmidt as the Red Skull. Before being assassinated by Hydra agent Heinz Kruger, Erskine motivates Rogers to always remain as a good man in his heart.

, the character has appeared in the film Captain America: The First Avenger. An alternate version of Erskine appeared in the Disney+ animated series What If...?

Christine Everhart 

Christine Everhart (portrayed by Leslie Bibb) is a news reporter for Vanity Fair and later a news broadcaster for WHiH World News.

, the character has appeared in two films: Iron Man and Iron Man 2; as well as the WHIH Newsfront viral marketing campaign. Alternate versions of Everhart appeared in the Disney+ animated series What If...?

F

Fandral 

Fandral (initially portrayed by Joshua Dallas and subsequently by Zachary Levi), also known as Fandral the Dashing, is a member of the Warriors Three, depicted as a dashing warrior from Asgard. He is killed by Hela in 2017.

, the character has appeared in four films: Thor, Thor: The Dark World, Thor: Ragnarok, and Thor: Love and Thunder (archival footage). An alternate version of Fandral appeared in the Disney+ animated series What If...?, voiced by Max Mittelman.

Wilson Fisk / Kingpin

John Flynn 

John Flynn (portrayed by Bradley Whitford) is a senior agent of the Strategic Scientific Reserve. After the end of World War II, Peggy Carter is among the agents stationed under him though he never assigns her to field work. Though he wants to officially punish her after she goes against orders and successfully retrieves the mysterious Zodiac serum, she is promoted to head of S.H.I.E.L.D. alongside Howard Stark, with him now working under her.

, the character has appeared in the Marvel One-Shot Agent Carter. An alternate version of Flynn appeared in the Disney+ animated series What If...?

Bill Foster 

Dr. William "Bill" Foster (portrayed by Laurence Fishburne) is a physicist and the former Giant-Man. He was Hank Pym's assistant on "Project Goliath" and is Ava Starr's surrogate father after Elihas' death. In 2018, Foster teaches quantum physics at UC Berkeley when he encounters his former employer, Scott Lang, and Hope van Dyne. When Ava restrains Pym, Lang and Hope, Foster states that he has been working to cure Ava by obtaining quantum energy from the Quantum Realm. As Pym knows that Foster's plan will affect Janet van Dyne's rescue, Hope and Pym manage their escape. When Lang goes into the Quantum Ralm, Pym talks Foster down and states that he will find a way to help stabilize Ava as Pym's ants see Foster out. After Janet is rescued from the realm and gives some of her energy to stabilize Ava, Foster takes Ava away as Pym still vows to find a way to help stabilize Ava for good.

, the character has appeared in the film Ant-Man and the Wasp.

Jane Foster / Mighty Thor

Frigga 

Frigga (portrayed by Rene Russo) is Thor's biological mother and Loki's adopted mother, who is killed by Algrim in 2013. In 2023, Thor time travels to 2013, where Frigga comforts his depression during his mission to retrieve the Reality Stone. She also knows that her time is near, and prevents Thor from telling her how she dies by encouraging him to change his future.

, the character has appeared in three films: Thor, Thor: The Dark World and Thor: Love and Thunder (cameo and archival footage); as well as the Disney+ series Loki (archival footage). An alternate version of Frigga appeared in Avengers: Endgame. An alternate version of Frigga appeared in the Disney+ animated series What If...?, voiced by Josette Eales.

Nick Fury

G

Mac Gargan 

MacDonald "Mac" Gargan (portrayed by Michael Mando) is a professional criminal and one of Adrian Toomes' potential buyers. In the wake of an encounter with Spider-Man, Gargan is arrested by the FBI and vows revenge, seeking out new allies to help him kill Spider-Man. He approaches Toomes in prison on the basis of certain rumours, wanting to know Spider-Man's identity to settle personal scores. Toomes denies that he knows it, however.

, the character has appeared in the film Spider-Man: Homecoming. An alternate version of Gargan as Scorpion will appear in the upcoming Disney+ animated series Spider-Man: Freshman Year.

Gamora

Gilgamesh 

Gilgamesh (portrayed by Don Lee) is the strongest Eternal, able to project an exoskeleton of cosmic energy. He has a deep connection with Thena, and stays as her guardian over the centuries after the Eternals split ways in 1521. At Druig's residence, Gilgamesh is killed by the rapidly evolving Deviant Kro, who absorbs his powers and memories.

Lee took the role to inspire younger generations as the first mainstream Korean superhero. Lee was able to utilize his training in boxing in the character's fight choreography.

, the character has appeared in the film Eternals.

Corvus Glaive 

Corvus Glaive (voiced and portrayed via motion capture in live-action by Michael James Shaw) is one of Thanos' adopted sons. He joined his father in his quest for the six Infinity Stones, initially attacked the Statesman with his siblings and helped to kill the Asgardians aboard and retrieve the Space Stone. While attempting to retrieve the Mind Stone from Vision with Proxima Midnight, they are met in battle and defeated by Steve Rogers, Natasha Romanoff, and Sam Wilson. During a second attempt, Midnight leads the Outriders in attacking the Avengers on the ground to distract from Glaive infiltrating Shuri's lab to attack her, which leads Vision to come to her defense and tackle Glaive out of the lab. Rogers intervenes in the fight, but Glaive incapacitates the former before Vision kills the latter. A past version of Glaive from 2014 travels through time with Thanos' army to fight the Avengers, only to be killed by Okoye.

, the character has appeared in the film: Avengers: Infinity War. An alternate version of Glaive appeared in Avengers: Endgame. An alternate version of Glaive appeared in the Disney+ animated series What If...?, voiced by Fred Tatasciore.

Gorr the God Butcher 

Gorr (portrayed by Christian Bale) is the scarred final prophet of his civilization's god, Rapu; following the deaths of his people and daughter Love, and dismissal by Rapu, Gorr is corrupted by the "strange and terrifying" necrosword and transformed into the newest God Butcher, a galactic killer who seeks the extinction of the gods. After making his way to Eternity to wish the extinction of the gods, Gorr is freed from the necrosword's influence by Thor and Jane Foster, and he instead wishes for his daughter Love's resurrection, sharing one final moment with her before dying.

, the character has appeared in the film Thor: Love and Thunder.

Grandmaster 

The Grandmaster (portrayed by Jeff Goldblum) is the ruler of Sakaar, where he hosts a series of games called the Contest of Champions. He is the brother of the Collector.

, the character has appeared in two films: Guardians of the Galaxy Vol. 2 (end credits sequence) and Thor: Ragnarok; and one short film: Team Darryl. Alternate versions of the Grandmaster appeared in the Disney+ animated series What If...?

Groot

H

Justin Hammer 

Justin Hammer (portrayed by Sam Rockwell) is a weapons manufacturer and rival of Tony Stark. After noticing Ivan Vanko's use of an arc reactor-based weapon, he breaks Vanko out of jail and uses him for making weapons, including turning James Rhodes' armor into War Machine.

, the character has appeared in the film Iron Man 2 and the Marvel One-Shot All Hail the King.

Maya Hansen 

Maya Hansen (portrayed by Rebecca Hall) is a scientist and a developer of the Extremis virus. She then works for Aldrich Killian who uses the virus as a weapon. She is later killed by him after she turns on him and has a change of heart.

, the character has appeared in the film Iron Man 3.

Agatha Harkness 

Agatha Harkness (portrayed by Kathryn Hahn) is a witch. In 1693, she kills members of her Salem coven (including her mother Evanora) when they attempt to execute her for practicing dark magic. She is initially portrayed as a friendly neighbor of Wanda Maximoff in Westview, but is ultimately revealed to be after Maximoff's powers.

, the character has appeared in the Disney+ series WandaVision. She will return in the upcoming Disney+ series Agatha: Coven of Chaos.

Roger Harrington 

Roger Harrington (portrayed by Martin Starr) is a science teacher at Midtown School of Science and Technology. In 2011, as a student at Culver University, he grants Bruce Banner access to the computers in exchange for some pizza. After graduating, he goes on to become a teacher and the coach of the school Academic Decathlon Team. He goes as a chaperone on a school sponsored trip to Europe in 2024. Among his students are Peter Parker, Flash Thompson, Michelle Jones, Ned Leeds, and Betty Brant.

, the character has appeared in four films: The Incredible Hulk (cameo), Spider-Man: Homecoming, Spider-Man: Far From Home, and Spider-Man: No Way Home.

Arthur Harrow 

Arthur Harrow (portrayed by Ethan Hawke) is a cult leader and avatar of Ammit who encourages Marc Spector to embrace his inner darkness. While named after a minor single-issue Moon Knight adversary from the comic books, Harrow is an original character, depicted as the former avatar of Khonshu.

Hawke also portrays Doctor Harrow, a psychiatrist version that only exists in Steven Grant's and Spector's mind, who helps Grant confront the truth of his mother's death while denying Khonshu's existence.

, the character has appeared in the Disney+ series Moon Knight.

Tyler Hayward 

Tyler Hayward (portrayed by Josh Stamberg) is the acting director of S.W.O.R.D., having taken over from Maria Rambeau following her death. Following the Blip, he is shown to have animosity against superheroes, viewing Wanda Maximoff as dangerous which leads to him kicking colleague Monica Rambeau off the Westview investigation for having defended Maximoff. He is revealed to have lied to Monica, FBI agent Jimmy Woo, and astrophysicist Darcy Lewis earlier about Maximoff and has been working on a secret project dealing with Vision. The project culminates with Vision being reactivated by exposure to Maximoff's powers from a drone. However, his plan to eliminate Maximoff with Vision when the android's memories are restored by the created version of Vision inside the Hex. When Maximoff's alternate reality is partially taken down, Darcy stops Hayward from killing Maximoff's children Billy and Tommy, and he is arrested for tampering with evidence and removed from S.W.O.R.D.

, the character has appeared in the Disney+ series WandaVision.

Heimdall 

Heimdall (portrayed by Idris Elba) is the sole protector of the Bifröst in Asgard and Thor's best friend, inspired by the mythical Heimdall in Norse mythology. He is ultimately killed by Thanos in 2018 after sending Hulk to Earth via the Bifröst to warn the Avengers of Thanos' conquest. His soul enters Valhalla afterwards, where he greets Jane Foster after she sacrifices herself to help defeat Gorr the God Butcher in 2024.

, the character has appeared in six films: Thor, Thor: The Dark World, Avengers: Age of Ultron, Thor: Ragnarok, Avengers: Infinity War, and Thor: Love and Thunder (post-credits cameo). An alternate version of Heimdall appeared in the Disney+ animated series What If...?

Hela 

Hela (portrayed by Cate Blanchett), also known as the Goddess of Death, is the eldest daughter of Odin, Thor's father and king of Asgard. Like Thor, her powers are drawn from Asgard and are strongest while she's there. As Odin's executioner, she helped conquer realms that allowed Asgard to grow and prosper. However, being the Goddess of Death, her growing destructive ambition led Odin to cast her out of the realm, which consequently weakened her powers and allowed Asgard to enjoy times of peace within the Nine Realms. Hela's banishment is rescinded upon the death of Odin, at which time she returns to claim her rightful place as queen. Her return is significant as the beginning of Ragnarok, the prophesied destruction of Asgard.

, the character has appeared in the film Thor: Ragnarok.

Hercules 

Hercules (portrayed by Brett Goldstein) is the son of Zeus, based on the Greek mythological deity of the same name. He is sent by his father to hunt down Thor as revenge for stealing Zeus' thunderbolt.

, the character has appeared in the film Thor: Love and Thunder (mid-credits cameo).

Maria Hill 

Maria Hill (portrayed by Cobie Smulders) is a recurring S.H.I.E.L.D. member and ally to Nick Fury. In 2018, she is a victim of the Blip, being restored to life in 2023.

, the character has appeared in five films: The Avengers, Captain America: The Winter Soldier, Avengers: Age of Ultron, Avengers: Infinity War (post-credits cameo), and Avengers: Endgame, as well as three episodes of the television series Agents of S.H.I.E.L.D. She is also impersonated by the Skrull Soren in Spider-Man: Far From Home. An alternate version of Maria Hill appeared in the Disney+ animated series What If...? She will return in the upcoming Disney+ series Secret Invasion.

Happy Hogan 

Harold "Happy" Hogan (portrayed by Jon Favreau) is Tony Stark's bodyguard and close friend, and head of security for Stark Industries. Hogan is later assigned by Stark as head of Asset Management for the Avengers. He also serves as a mentor to Peter Parker after Stark's death and is romantically attracted to Parker's aunt, May.

, the character has appeared in seven films: Iron Man, Iron Man 2, Iron Man 3, Spider-Man: Homecoming, Avengers: Endgame, Spider-Man: Far From Home, and Spider-Man: No Way Home. Alternate versions of Happy Hogan appeared in the Disney+ animated series What If...?

Hogun 

Hogun (portrayed by Tadanobu Asano), also known as Hogun the Grim, is a member of the Warriors Three of Asgard, depicted as a Vanir grim warrior from Vanaheim. He is killed by Hela in 2017.

, the character has appeared in four films: Thor, Thor: The Dark World, Thor: Ragnarok, and Thor: Love and Thunder (archival footage). An alternate version of Hogun appeared in the Disney+ animated series What If...?, voiced by David Chen.

Lemar Hoskins / Battlestar 

Sergeant major Lemar Hoskins (portrayed by Clé Bennett), also known as Battlestar, is the partner of John Walker, the new Captain America. Hoskins and Walker served together in Operation Enduring Freedom and Hoskins laments that they could have saved a lot of lives had they been super soldiers. During a fight with the Flag Smashers, Karli Morgenthau punches him into a concrete pillar, killing him.

, the character has appeared in the Disney+ series The Falcon and the Winter Soldier.

Howard the Duck 

Howard the Duck (voiced by Seth Green) is an anthropomorphic duck who used to be one of the Collector's specimens. He is briefly shown later joining the Avengers and other heroes in the final battle against Thanos.

, the character has appeared in three films: Guardians of the Galaxy, Guardians of the Galaxy Vol. 2, and Avengers: Endgame (cameo). An alternate version of Howard appeared in the Disney+ animated series What If...?

I

Ikaris 

Ikaris (portrayed by Richard Madden) is an Eternal who can fly and project cosmic energy beams from his eyes. He also has superhuman strength and durability. Throughout history, Ikaris was Sersi's romantic partner before leaving her thousands of years ago. In 2024, after discovering that the Eternal's leader Ajak plans to stop the Emergence, Ikaris feeds her to the Deviants before reuniting with the rest of the Eternals on Earth, betraying the team in order to uphold Arishem's instructions. However, he is unable to bring himself to kill Sersi, and joins his fellow Eternals to form the Uni-Mind and stop the Emergence of Tiamut. Guilt-ridden, Ikaris commits suicide by flying into the Sun.

Madden described the relationship between Ikaris and Sersi as having "a deep level of romance," and they are "two opposing sides of how they connect with the world," referencing Sersi's growing love for humanity compared to Ikaris' indifference. Madden sought to portray the character in a way that would not come across as being "bored of everything." Director Chloé Zhao was influenced by Zack Snyder's interpretation of Superman in Man of Steel (2013) for its authenticity and realness.

, the character has appeared in the film Eternals. An alternate version of the character will appear in the upcoming Disney+ animated series Marvel Zombies.

J

J. Jonah Jameson

Edwin Jarvis

Jentorra 

Jentorra (portrayed by Katy O'Brian) is the leader of the Freedom Fighters in the Quantum Realm.

, the character has appeared in the film Ant-Man and the Wasp: Quantumania.

Jon Jon 

Jon Jon (portrayed by Ronny Chieng) is Xialing's right-hand man and announcer at her underground fighting club. He later joins the Ten Rings after Xialing assumes leadership and restructures it.

, the character has appeared in the film Shang-Chi and the Legend of the Ten Rings.

Michelle "MJ" Jones-Watson

K

Kaecilius 

Kaecilius (portrayed by Mads Mikkelsen) is a Master of the Mystic Arts who broke away from the teachings of the Ancient One to become a follower of Dormammu. Leading a band of fellow zealots, Kaecilius seeks to destroy the Sanctums to allow Dormammu to bring Earth into the Dark Dimension. When Doctor Strange manages to defeat Dormammu with a time loop, the Dark Dimension retreats, bringing Kaecilius and his followers with him to experience a hellish eternal life.

Kaecilius was developed as a combination of several comic book characters, ultimately to drive the introduction of bigger villains for the future of the MCU, including the concept of "certain individuals who live in other dimensions." Director Scott Derrickson compared the dynamic to that of Saruman and Sauron in The Lord of the Rings, citing the "human relatability" of Kaecilius and Saruman while a "huge and fantastical" villain like Dormammu or Sauron orchestrates events in the background. Recognizing the criticism of past MCU villains, Derrickson said he hoped to show "Kaecilius's point of view and what makes him tick" in the time that he could, and that the character was a "man of ideas" with "watertight logic," comparing him to John Doe from Seven or the Joker from The Dark Knight. Mikkelsen's makeup showing the corruption of the Dark Dimension took between 2–3 hours to apply.

, the character has appeared in the film Doctor Strange.

Kamran 

Kamran (portrayed by Rish Shah) is a new student at Kamala Khan's high school on whom she develops a crush. Kamala discovers that Kamran is the son of Najma, an inter-dimensional being known as a Clandestine, or djinn, who knew Kamala's great-grandmother Aisha. The Clandestines want to use Kamala's new powers to return home to the Noor dimension, but they grow violent when she hesitates due to the potential danger. Kamran and the Clandestines are captured and imprisoned by Damage Control, but they quickly escape, and Kamran is abandoned by his mother after sustaining an injury during the escape. Najma later sees the error in her ways, sacrificing herself to close the Noor. Her power is transferred to Kamran, who can create hard blue light structures, though the Noor continues to escape through him. He is saved by Kamala, and joins the Red Daggers.

Shah stated that Kamran is able to relate so easily to Kamala because of his "lack of belonging and community," and he feels he is able to express himself culturally around her.

, the character has appeared in the Disney+ series Ms. Marvel.

Kang the Conqueror  

Kang the Conqueror (portrayed by Jonathan Majors) is a scientist from the 31st Century, who had discovered the existence of the Multiverse and his alternate selves. Unlike most of his Variants, Kang sought to conquer as many worlds as possible, so he started the Multiversal War.

An alternate version of Kang dubbed He Who Remains (also portrayed by Jonathan Majors) is the creator of the Time Variance Authority, which he founded after a Multiversal war between him and his variants. He resided in the Citadel at the End of Time before being ultimately killed by Sylvie.

Alternate versions of Kang including Rama-Tut, Scarlet Centurion and Immortus (also portrayed by Jonathan Majors) formed the Council of Kangs. Following Kang’s death, they discuss that the Avengers may have to be dealt with as they are not only touching the fabric of the Multiverse but were even able to seemingly kill one of their own.

An alternate version of Kang travelled into the 20th Century, becoming known as Victor Timely (also portrayed by Jonathan Majors). He starred in a show under his alias. Loki Laufeyson and Mobius M. Mobius attended one of these shows while attempting to track him down, with Loki realizing he was a Variant of He Who Remains.

, Kang the Conqueror has appeared in the film Ant-Man and the Wasp: Quantumania, He Who Remains has appeared in the Disney+ series Loki, the Council of Kangs has appeared in the mid-credit scene of the film Ant-Man and the Wasp: Quantumania and Victor Timely has appeared in the post-credit scene of the film. The character will return in the second season of the Disney+ series Loki, the films Avengers: The Kang Dynasty and Avengers: Secret Wars.

Kareem / Red Dagger 

Kareem (portrayed by Aramis Knight) is a member of the Red Daggers who was chosen to hold their titular warrior mantle of Red Dagger.

, the character has appeared in the Disney+ series Ms. Marvel.

Katy 

Katy (portrayed by Awkwafina), also known as Ruiwen, is a hotel valet and Shang-Chi's best friend who was unaware of his past. 

, the character has appeared in the film Shang-Chi and the Legend of the Ten Rings. An alternate version of the character will appear in the upcoming Disney+ animated series Marvel Zombies.

Kazimierz Kazimierczak 

Kazimierz "Kazi" Kazimierczak (portrayed by Fra Fee) is a prominent member of the Tracksuit Mafia. He is the second in command and personal sign interpreter to Maya Lopez, who has been his friend since childhood.

, the character has appeared in the Disney+ series Hawkeye.

Harley Keener 

Harley Keener (portrayed by Ty Simpkins) is a child from Tennessee who, in 2012, assists Tony Stark following the destruction of his mansion and the ongoing attacks by the "Mandarin" (Aldrich Killian). In 2023, Keener attends Stark's funeral.

, the character has appeared in two films: Iron Man 3 and Avengers: Endgame (cameo).

Kamala Khan / Ms. Marvel

Khan family 

Kamala Khan's family play an important role in her life. Her parents are Muneeba and Yusuf Khan (portrayed by Zenobia Shroff and Mohan Kapur respectively), and her older brother is Aamir (portrayed by Saagar Shaikh). , these characters have appeared in the Disney+ series Ms. Marvel, and they will return in the upcoming film The Marvels.

Aamir's fiancée and later wife is Tyesha Hillman (portrayed by Travina Springer). Muneeba's mother is Sana (portrayed by Samina Ahmad), who still lives in Karachi. Sana's mother was Aisha (portrayed by Mehwish Hayat), a Clandestine who fell in love with Sana's father Hasan (portrayed by Fawad Khan) and decided to stay on Earth and passed the mystical bangle down through the generations, before Aisha was killed by fellow Clandestine Najma. , these characters have appeared in the Disney+ series Ms. Marvel.

Khonshu 

Khonshu (motion-captured by Karim El Hakim, voiced by F. Murray Abraham) is the Egyptian moon god, an outcast amongst the gods for waging a "one-god war on perceived injustices", thus necessitating him to find and use his avatar, Marc Spector. He is based on the Egyptian God with the same name.

, the character has appeared in the Disney+ series Moon Knight.

Aldrich Killian 

Aldrich Killian (portrayed by Guy Pearce) is the co-developer of the Extremis virus. He is also depicted as the founder of Advanced Idea Mechanics (A.I.M.). Starting out as a sickly individual snubbed by Tony Stark in the past, he swore revenge. Years later, Killian participates in Maya Hansen's development of Extremis to cure himself, founds a terrorist movement with a group of Extremis-enhanced soldiers under his command, and poses as the Mandarin to ruin Stark, only to be killed by the Extremis-enhanced Pepper Potts.

, the character has appeared in the film Iron Man 3.

Kingo 

Kingo (portrayed by Kumail Nanjiani) is an Eternal who can project cosmic energy projectiles from his hands. Enamored with fame, Kingo becomes a popular Bollywood film actor and director to blend in on Earth. He also has a production company in Mumbai.

, the character has appeared in the film Eternals.

Ulysses Klaue 

Ulysses Klaue (portrayed by Andy Serkis) is a South African black-market arms dealer, smuggler, and gangster who is notorious for having stolen a quarter-ton of vibranium from the Wakandans in 1992. After losing his left arm to Ultron, Klaue replaces it with a prosthetic that doubles as a sonic weapon and works with Killmonger until the latter betrays and kills him to gain entrance into Wakanda.

, the character has appeared in two films: Avengers: Age of Ultron and Black Panther. An alternate version of Klaue appeared in the Disney+ animated series What If...?

Cameron Klein 

Cameron Klein (portrayed by Aaron Himelstein) is a S.H.I.E.L.D. agent and technician who stayed loyal to Steve Rogers during the Hydra uprising. He was later recruited by Fury and became one of his allies during the Battle of Sokovia and Infinity War.

, the character has appeared in two films: Captain America: The Winter Soldier and Avengers: Age of Ultron.

Korath 

Korath (portrayed by Djimon Hounsou) was a member of the Starforce during the Kree-Skrull War before becoming Ronan the Accuser's enforcer, during which he turns against Thanos and fights the Guardians of the Galaxy, only to be killed by Drax.

, the character has appeared in two films: Guardians of the Galaxy and Captain Marvel. An alternate version of Korath appeared in the Disney+ animated series What If...?

Korg 

Korg (voiced and motion-captured by Taika Waititi) is a Kronan warrior, who was forced to participate in the Contest of Champions on Sakaar, along with his best friend, Miek. He later leads a rebellion against the Grandmaster and escapes the planet with the help of Thor with the fight to protect the survivors of Asgard against Hela, went with the survivors that escaped from Thanos' attack on their ship to protect them, and travels to Earth. By 2023, he resides in Tønsberg, Norway, now named New Asgard, boarding with Thor and Miek, and playing online games, eventually marrying another Kronan named Dwayne by 2025.

, the character has appeared in three films: Thor: Ragnarok, Avengers: Endgame and Thor: Love and Thunder, with Waititi also directing the two Thor films. An alternate version of Korg appeared in the Disney+ animated series What If...?

 Kro 

Kro (voiced by Bill Skarsgård) is a Deviant who despises the Eternals. He is later killed by Thena.

, the character has appeared in the film Eternals.

 Heinz Kruger 

Heinz Kruger (portrayed by Richard Armitage) is the Red Skull's top assassin who kills Abraham Erskine before ingesting cyanide.

, the character has appeared in the film Captain America: The First Avenger. An alternate version of Kruger appeared in the Disney+ animated series What If...? Krylar 

Lord Krylar (portrayed by Bill Murray) is the Governor of Axia, a city located in the Quantum Realm.

, the character has appeared in the film Ant-Man and the Wasp: Quantumania.

 Kurt 

Kurt (portrayed by David Dastmalchian) is a friend and roommate of Scott Lang and Luis who works as the team's hacker during heists. He, Luis, and Dave are together known as the "Three Wombats". Dastmalchian stated that Kurt's last name is Goreshter.

, the character has appeared in two films: Ant-Man and Ant-Man and the Wasp. An alternate version of Kurt appeared in the Disney+ animated series What If...? L 
 Cassie Lang 

Cassandra "Cassie" Lang (portrayed by Abby Ryder Fortson in the first two films, Emma Fuhrmann in Avengers: Endgame, and Kathryn Newton in Ant-Man and the Wasp: Quantumania) is the daughter of Maggie and Scott Lang. Her parents eventually divorce based on her father's criminal activity and her mother forms a relationship with police officer Jim Paxton. When she finds out her father is Ant-Man, she fully supports him and longs to become his partner. After being trapped in the Quantum Realm, Scott returns to find that five years have passed after Thanos eliminated half of all life, though Cassie survived and grew up. After Scott helps save the world and restore the "blipped" individuals, Cassie works with Hank Pym and Hope van Dyne to build a quantum satellite as well as her own purple version of an "Ant-Man" suit. In the Quantum Realm, MODOK hacks her satellite and brings her family to the Quantum Realm, where she helps local rebels fight against the tyranny of the exiled Kang the Conqueror. 

, the character has appeared in four films: Ant-Man, Ant-Man and the Wasp, Avengers: Endgame and Ant-Man and the Wasp: Quantumania.

 Scott Lang / Ant-Man 

 Laufey 

Laufey (portrayed by Colm Feore) is the king of the Frost Giants based on Laufey in Norse mythology. He is the biological father of Loki who abandoned him as a child, due to his small size. Laufey has a strong hatred for Odin for his defeat in battle when he tried to conquer Earth. Loki convinces Laufey to take over Asgard himself, but betrays and kills Laufey to prove himself worthy of Odin.

, the character has appeared in the film Thor.

 Ned Leeds 

Ned Leeds (portrayed by Jacob Batalon) is Peter Parker's best friend and the first person other than Tony Stark and Happy Hogan to discover Parker's identity as Spider-Man. He falls victim to the Blip in 2018 but is revived in 2023. In 2024, following the exposure and incrimination of Parker's secret identity to the world, Ned, MJ, and Parker's university applications are all subsequently rejected due to the controversy, in spite of the lifting of his criminal charges. When villains from alternate realities are brought into their universe, Ned and MJ help Parker collect the displaced villains into the Sanctum Sanctorum. Following a staged coup by the alternate Norman Osborn that results in the villains breaking out of captivity and Peter's Aunt May losing her life in the process when she is killed by Osborn, Ned accidentally summons two alternate Spider-Men, referred to as "Peter-Two" and "Peter-Three," who aid the main universe's Parker in curing the villains. Ned and MJ share a final goodbye with Parker before Stephen Strange casts a spell which wipes the world's memories of Parker and sends the displaced individuals back to their realities, relinquishing Ned's friendship with Parker completely. He is a Filipino-American.

, the character has appeared in five films: Spider-Man: Homecoming, Avengers: Infinity War (cameo), Avengers: Endgame (cameo), Spider-Man: Far From Home, and Spider-Man: No Way Home, as well in the web series The Daily Bugle.

 Darcy Lewis 

Dr. Darcy Lewis (portrayed by Kat Dennings) is an original character in the MCU, often serving as comic relief. In 2011 and 2013, she is a political science major at Culver University and volunteer research assistant to astrophysicist Jane Foster for college credit. By 2023, she has a doctorate in astrophysics and is called in by S.W.O.R.D. to help investigate Westview.

, the character has appeared in three films: Thor, Thor: The Dark World, and Thor: Love and Thunder; as well as the Disney+ series WandaVision. An alternate version of Darcy Lewis appeared in the Disney+ animated series What If...? The character will make her comic book debut in the upcoming Scarlet Witch (2023) ongoing series.

 Liz 

Liz (portrayed by Laura Harrier) is a senior at Midtown School of Science and Technology who leads the decathlon team. She is the daughter of Adrian Toomes and initial love interest of Peter Parker.

, the character has appeared in the film Spider-Man: Homecoming.

 List 

Dr. List (portrayed by Henry Goodman) is a Hydra scientist who conducted the experimentation on Loki's scepter and the twins Pietro and Wanda Maximoff.

, the character has appeared in two films: Captain America: The Winter Soldier (mid-credits cameo) and Avengers: Age of Ultron; as well as the television series Agents of S.H.I.E.L.D.

 Maya Lopez 

Maya Lopez (portrayed by Alaqua Cox) is the Native American deaf leader of the Tracksuit Mafia who can perfectly imitate others' movements. She is the daughter of William Lopez (portrayed by Zahn McClarnon) and adopted niece of Wilson Fisk (Vincent D'Onofrio). A leader of the Tracksuit Mafia, William Lopez is killed by Clint Barton/Ronin during the Blip. By 2024, Maya commands the Tracksuits against Clint Barton and Kate Bishop, though she eventually turns on her "uncle" Kingpin when she finds out that he orchestrated her father's death.

, the character has appeared in the Disney+ series Hawkeye. She will return in the upcoming Disney+ series Echo.

 Loki 

 Luis 

Luis (portrayed by Michael Peña) is Scott Lang's best friend, serving as his ally and former criminal liaison.

, the character has appeared in two films: Ant-Man and Ant-Man and the Wasp''.

See also 
 Characters of the Marvel Cinematic Universe: M–Z
 Features of the Marvel Cinematic Universe
 Species of the Marvel Cinematic Universe
 Teams and organizations of the Marvel Cinematic Universe

References 

 
Lists of film characters
Lists of American television series characters